Kel Assouf is a Tuareg musical group making "Tuareg rock" with electronic influences. The band's singer, songwriter, and guitarist is Anana Harouna. Kel Assouf, in Tamasheq, means "nostalgia" and "son of eternity".

Career
Anana Harouna was born in Niger and lived in Libya during the Tuareg rebellion of the early 1990s, like the band members of Tinariwen, with whom he has performed. He formed Kel Assouf while arriving in Brussels in 2006. Oliver Penu, who plays drums on the third album, Black Tenere (2019), is Belgian, and Sofyann Ben Youssef is a Tunisian who produced the albums Tikounen (2016) and Black Tenere; he also plays keyboards to add bass lines, and occasionally plays frame drum in live performances.

Their third album, Black Tenere, released in 2019 employs drum lines from the Roland TR-808 and heavy guitar riffs. Robin Denselow, writing in The Guardian, gave Black Tenere four out of five stars, describing the music as "how the music of the Sahara sounds once it has migrated to Europe and fused with other influences".

Discography
 2010: Tin Hinane (Igloo Records)
 2016: Tikounen (Igloo Records/SOWAREX)
 2019: Black Tenere (Glitterbeat Records)

References

External links

Berber music
Desert blues